Mikhail Sergeyevich Boyarsky (born 26 December 1949 in Leningrad) is a Soviet and Russian actor and singer. He is best known for playing swashbucklers in historical adventure films; the role of d'Artagnan in the 1978 Soviet adaptation of Alexander Dumas' Three Musketeers elevated Boyarsky to the nationwide fame.

Biography 
Mikhail Sergeyevich Boyarsky was born 26 December 1949 in Leningrad in the family of Sergey Aleksandrovich Boyarsky and Yekaterina Mikhailovna Melentyeva, both Komissarzhevskaya Theatre actors. He studied piano in a music school affiliated with the Conservatory. After school, Boyarsky entered Institute of Theatre Music and Cinema, finishing in 1972, and began working in the Lensovet Theatre for Igor Vladimirov.

In the cinema, the actor made a debut in the films Bridges and The Straw Hat (1974), becoming well known in 1975 after his role in the picture Eldest Son. He found much greater popularity in the main role of Troubadour in the theatre musical The Troubadour and His Friends, with the princess played by Larisa Luppian, who soon became his wife. In 1976, he played the big bad wolf in the movie Ma-ma.

His popularity really took off in 1978 after Boyarsky starred in the musical film D'Artagnan and Three Musketeers. After that, he was typecast as a swashbuckler for two decades; he reprised his role as d'Artagnan in three sequels and portrayed other "sword and hat" characters in adventure movies like The Dog in the Manger (1978), The Prisoner of Château d'If (1988), Gardes-Marines, Ahead! (1988), Don César de Bazan (1989), Viva Gardes-Marines! (1991), Queen Margot (1996) and Taras Bulba (2009), among others. Being a singer, he also often starred in musical films. Occasionally he played against type, like in Extra Ticket or The Waiting Room.

In 2023 Boyarsky retired from acting, because of his age and health issues.

Personal life

With Larisa Luppian, he has a son, Sergey Boyarsky (born in 1980), and a daughter, Elizaveta Boyarskaya (born 20 December 1985).

Since April 2013 - the leader of the Movement for rights of smokers.

In March 2014 he signed a letter in support of the position of the President of Russia Vladimir Putin on the official Russia's position on the Crimean question. In February 2023 Canada sanctioned Mikhail Boyarsky for being involved in Russian propaganda and spreading misinformation relating to the 2022 war in Ukraine.

As a native of Saint Petersburg, Boyarsky is a fan of local FC Zenit.

Popular songs
 Vse proidet 
 Gorodskie Cveti 
 
  
 Spasibo, rodnaya 
 Pesnya mushketyorov
 Syadu v skory poezd

Honours and awards
Honored Artist of the RSFSR (1984)
People's Artist of the RSFSR (1990)
Order of Friendship (2001)
Medal "In Commemoration of the 300th Anniversary of Saint Petersburg" (2003)
Order "For Merit to the Fatherland", 4th class (2009)
Order of Honour (Moldova) (2011)
Order of Honour (2020)

Filmography

References

External links 

1949 births
20th-century Russian male actors
20th-century Russian male singers
21st-century Russian male actors
21st-century Russian male singers
Living people
Male actors from Saint Petersburg
Singers from Saint Petersburg
Academicians of the Russian Academy of Cinema Arts and Sciences "Nika"
Musicians from Saint Petersburg
Russian State Institute of Performing Arts alumni
Honored Artists of the RSFSR
People's Artists of the RSFSR
Recipients of the Order "For Merit to the Fatherland", 4th class
Recipients of the Order of Honour (Moldova)
Recipients of the Order of Honour (Russia)
Winners of the Golden Gramophone Award
People with type 1 diabetes
Russian people of Polish descent
Russian keyboardists
Russian male child actors
Russian male film actors
Russian male guitarists
Russian male singers
Russian male stage actors
Russian male television actors
Russian male voice actors
Russian pop singers
Russian stunt performers
Russian television presenters
Soviet male child actors
Soviet male film actors
Soviet male singers
Soviet male stage actors
Soviet male television actors
Soviet male voice actors
Soviet pop singers
Anti-Ukrainian sentiment in Russia
United Russia politicians